"She Don't" is a R&B song written by Walter Milsap and Candice Nelson for LeToya Luckett's self-titled debut album LeToya (2006). It was produced by Walter Misap and released as the album's second single in the summer of 2006. Although the song was expected to follow its predecessor success, the song only achieved moderate success throughout United States. The song contains a sample from The Spinners' song "We Belong Together".

Background
Following the success of her debut single, "Torn", which peaked at number two on the US Hot R&B/Hip-Hop Songs chart, LeToya explained to MTV News that "She Don't" was released as "a kind of a follow-up to 'Torn' since we have decided to leave him alone," referencing 'the love-him-or-leave-him story line' of "Torn". "He's got with somebody else but he's unhappy because he realizes the new girl will never be me. She won't love him, and I was loyal. You got to deal with it."

Music video
Capitol chose She Don't to become Luckett's second single, and the video was directed by Chris Robinson, who also directed her previous video for "Torn". It was shot in Atlanta in the week of June 28, 2006 and premiered on July 5, 2006 on BET's Access Granted.

At the start of the video Luckett arrives in a Lamborghini Gallardo showing her case better than before (emotionally, financially and beautifully) ironically Slim Thug, LeToya's ex-boyfriend, appears in this video with role as her ex-boyfriend. As the video progresses Luckett direct herself away from her ex, but then he follows her, after a brief conversation (this being the song itself) she leaves the place, confusing his mind, then Luckett shows with dark outfit in a dark place, referring to his dreams. Then Slim Thug is seen driving a Cadillac with his current girlfriend, but it changes turning out to be Luckett. After this Luckett is shown in a bilinear gradient glass-field making sensual moves. Finally at the end of the video, all environments are shown in a lapse of time turning out to be only Slim Thug's dreams. He then gets out of bed, where his girlfriend is laying and calls up "Toya." The music video had a brief success on BET's 106 & Park peaking at the #2 position on the countdown.

The music clip is featured as an enhanced video on the Japanese Special edition of the album LeToya alongside "Torn".

Chart performance
In late July 2006, the track debuted at number 62 on the US Hot R&B/Hip-Hop Songs chart. In September, over two months after the release, the song finally entered the Top 20, peaking at number 17 on the R&B/Hip Hop chart. While the single was successful on the R&B charts, the single failed to chart on the Billboard Hot 100. The song, however, was able to reach number two on Billboard's Bubbling Under Hot 100 Singles.

Track listing
 She Don't (Edit)
 She Don't (Album Version)
 She Don't (Remix) featuring Nas

Charts

Weekly charts

Year-end charts

References

2006 singles
LeToya Luckett songs
Music videos directed by Chris Robinson (director)
Songs written by Candice Nelson (songwriter)
2006 songs
Capitol Records singles